Hooks is an unincorporated community in Russell County, Alabama, United States.

History
Hooks was named after John J. Hooks, the first postmaster. The post office was established in 1893, and remained in operation until it was discontinued in 1915.

References

Unincorporated communities in Russell County, Alabama
Unincorporated communities in Alabama